The Acqua Acetosa station is a railway station on the Rome–Civitacastellana–Viterbo railway.
It is located in the urban section of Rome (Italy), in the quarter Parioli.

History 
The station was put into operation on October 28, 1932, as part of the railway line between Rome and Civita Castellana.

The area and the station are named after the source of Acqua Acetosa and the homonymous fountain.

In 2008-2009 the station underwent a renovation, during which the level of the platforms was raised.

Services 
The station has:
  Ticket machine

Interchanges 
  Bus stop

See also 
 Rome–Civitacastellana–Viterbo railway

Notes

External links 
 The station on the ATAC website. 
 
 

Railway stations in Rome